Eudule is a genus of moths in the family Geometridae erected by Jacob Hübner in 1823.

Species
Eudule bimacula Walker, 1854 Colombia
Eudule pulchricolora Hübner, 1823 West Indies
Eudule venata Schaus, 1892 Peru
Eudule sceata (Schaus, 1892) Peru
Eudule limbata Burmeister, 1878 Peru
Eudule una (Schaus, 1892) Rio de Janeiro in Brazil

References

Eudulini